Charmkhowran or Charmkhvoran; also known as Charmkhvar, may refer to:
 Charmkhowran-e Bala
 Charmkhowran-e Sofla